Ruler of the Road is a 1918 silent film drama directed by Ernest C. Warde and starring Frank Keenan. It was produced and released by the Pathé Exchange company.

Cast
Frank Keenan - Simeon Tetlow
Kathryn Lean - Edith Burton
Thomas Jackson - John Bennett
Frank Sheridan - Hugh Tomlinson
Ned Burton - J. Montgomery Nixon
John Charles - Gus Harrington

Preservation status
The film is preserved in the Cinematheque Francais, Paris.

References

External links
Ruler of the Road at IMDb.com

1918 films
American silent feature films
American black-and-white films
Pathé Exchange films
Films based on American novels
Films based on short fiction
Silent American drama films
1918 drama films
Films directed by Ernest C. Warde
1910s American films